Ben Badis District is a district of Sidi Bel Abbès Province, Algeria.

Districts of Sidi Bel Abbès Province